Samaria Johnson (born January 13, 1982), better known as Sam Jay, is an American comedian and writer. She is best known as a writer for Saturday Night Live (2017–present), her Netflix comedy special 3 in the Morning (2020), and as the co-creator and co-star of the HBO comedy series PAUSE with Sam Jay (2021–present) and the Peacock comedy series Bust Down (2022–present).

Early life 
Jay was born Samaria Johnson in Atlanta on January 13, 1982. She grew up in the Dorchester neighborhood of Boston, and studied for a degree in communications but quit due to lack of interest.

Career
After years of working in an office and as a music manager, Jay performed her first stand-up comedy routine in 2012, at the age of 29. In 2017, she joined the writing staff of Saturday Night Live, becoming the first black lesbian writer in the show's history and the second black lesbian to be involved with the show overall (after performer Danitra Vance joined the cast 32 years prior). She co-wrote the "Black Jeopardy" sketch. In 2018, she performed stand-up on Netflix's The Comedy Lineup and starred in a half-hour stand-up special for Comedy Central Stand-Up Presents.

Jay's first stand-up comedy release was Donna's Daughter (2018), which was made available as audio only. Her first Netflix stand-up comedy special, 3 in the Morning (2020), was filmed at The Masquerade in Atlanta and received acclaim. Her other work includes appearances on Take My Wife (2016–2018) and stand-up performances on Jimmy Kimmel Live! and at the 2017 Just for Laughs Comedy Festival.

In September 2020, it was announced that HBO had ordered a sitcom co-written by and starring Jay. She partnered with producer Prentice Penny to create the series, which was named PAUSE with Sam Jay. The first season premiered in May 2021, and the show was renewed by HBO for a second season two months later. The comedy series Bust Down, co-created and co-starring by Jay, premiered on Peacock in March 2022.

Style
Jay's stage persona has been described as self-aware and observational, inviting comparisons to Patrice O'Neal.

Personal life
Jay has discussed being a black lesbian during her stand-up routines.

Comedy albums

Filmography

Film
 2023: You People

Television
 2012: Just for Laughs: All Access (TV series) – (episode: "Episode #6.6")
 2015: Get Your Life (TV series) – Lady in Dickies (episode: "Girl Get Your Blacktresses")
 2016: Take My Wife (TV series) – (episode: "Punchline")
 2016: Flophouse (TV documentary) – (episode: "Haircuts at Babe Island")
 2016: The Meltdown with Jonah and Kumail (TV series) – (episode: "The One Without Neil DeGrasse Tyson")
 2017: Pinsky (TV series) – Sam
 2017: Comedy Central Presents (TV series) – (episode: "Sam Jay")
 2018–present: Saturday Night Live (TV series) – writer
 2018: Nobodies (TV series) – Andrea
 2018: The Comedy Lineup (TV series) – executive producer, writer (episode: "Sam Jay")
 2018: 2018 MTV Movie & TV Awards (TV special) – writer
 2018: 70th Primetime Emmy Awards (TV special) – writer
 2019: Broad City (TV series) – Doorwoman (episode: "Along Came Molly")
 2019: Donald Glover Presents (TV mini-series) – writer (5 episodes)
 2020: BET Awards 2020 (TV special) – writer
 2020: Shrill (TV series) – Fran's Friend (2 episodes)
 2021: Kenan (TV series) – consulting producer
 2021: That Damn Michael Che (TV series) – Barber (episode: "Well Played, Crackers")
 2021: Pause with Sam Jay (TV series) – executive producer, writer
 2022: Bust Down (TV series) – Sam, also co-creator, executive producer

Awards and nominations 
 2018: Emmys, Outstanding Writing for a Variety Series for Saturday Night Live (nominee)
 2019: Emmys, Outstanding Writing for a Variety Series for Saturday Night Live (nominee)
 2020: Writers Guild of America, Best Comedy/Variety – Sketch Series for Saturday Night Live (nominee)

References

External links 
 
 

Living people
American stand-up comedians
Comedians from Massachusetts
Writers from Boston
Lesbian comedians
African-American female comedians
African-American stand-up comedians
American women comedians
LGBT African Americans
American lesbian writers
1982 births
21st-century African-American people
21st-century African-American women
20th-century African-American people
20th-century African-American women
American television writers
American women television writers
Screenwriters from Massachusetts
21st-century American screenwriters